The Unknown Hitman: The Story of El Cholo Adrián or simply El desconocido, is a Mexican crime drama television series produced and broadcast by Cine Latino, along to Plus Entertainment. The series is directed by Gonzalo González, and written by Erick Hernández. The story revolves around the story of Orso Iván Gastelum better known as "El Cholo" who is known for being Joaquín "El Chapo" Guzmán's right hand. It stars Guillermo Iván as the titular character.

The first season that consists of five episodes premiered on 27 July 2017 on Cine Latino, and aired every Sunday at 11:00 p.m. The season tells the origins of Adrián, born in a family of drug traffickers from a town in Sinaloa, Mexico. It also tells about the murder of beauty queen Susana Flores, winner of the Miss Sinaloa contest in 2012, and also makes references to the meetings of actress Kate del Castillo with El Chapo.

The second season, which consists of 8 episodes premiered on 17 March 2019. While the first season was inspired by the lives of El Cholo, El Chapo and the Sinaloa cartel, the second season is totally fictional, although it is inspired by the daily reality that thousands of people live through the drug trafficking business.

All 13 episodes of the series was available for streaming since December 2017 on Netflix.

Cast  
 Guillermo Iván as El Cholo
 Marco Uriel as General Garrido
 Jose Angel Bichir as Lobo
 Paty Blanco as Josefina
 Scarlet Gruber as Karla
 Quetzalli Bulnes as Belinda
 Liliana Moreno Reynoso as Carmen
 Fernando Sarfatti as El Gobernador 
 María del Carmen Félix as La Coty
 César Manjarrez as El Chapo
 Rodrigo Ostap as Panchito
 Mauricio Mendoza as Osorio 
 Carlos Segura as Capitan Huerta

References

External links 
 

Mexican television series
2017 Mexican television series debuts
Television series about organized crime
Spanish-language Netflix original programming
Television shows set in Mexico
Works about Mexican drug cartels